Richeria is a genus of flowering plant belonging to the  family Phyllanthaceae first described as a genus in 1797. It is native to Central America, South America, and the West Indies. Richeria is dioecious, with male and female flowers on separate plants.

Species
 Richeria australis - São Paulo, Mato Grosso
 Richeria dressleri - Costa Rica, Nicaragua, Panama, Ecuador
 Richeria grandis - Panama, N South America, E West Indies
 Richeria obovata  - Costa Rica to Bolivia
 Richeria tomentosa - Colombia, Ecuador

Formerly included
moved to Podocalyx 
Richeria loranthoides - Podocalyx loranthoides

References

Phyllanthaceae
Phyllanthaceae genera
Taxa named by Martin Vahl
Dioecious plants